Zielony Gaj may refer to the following places:
Zielony Gaj, Sokółka County in Podlaskie Voivodeship (north-east Poland)
Zielony Gaj, Giżycko County in Warmian-Masurian Voivodeship (north Poland)
Zielony Gaj, Mrągowo County in Warmian-Masurian Voivodeship (north Poland)